Downtown Salem Historic District is a national historic district located at Salem, Virginia. The district encompasses 34 contributing buildings and 1 contributing site in downtown Salem.  The district includes primarily mixed-use commercial buildings, but also includes churches, dwellings, a courthouse, a post office, a library, a park, and the covered stalls of a farmer's market.  The buildings mostly date from the late-19th and early-20th century and are in a variety of popular architectural styles including Greek Revival, Italianate, and Queen Anne.  Notable buildings include the Stevens House or "Old Post House" (1820s-1830s), Kizer-Webber Building (1883-1886), Duval-Oakey House (1891-1898), Salem High School (former, 1911-1912), Old Salem Municipal Building and Fire Department (1925), Quality Bakery Building (c. 1903-1913), Olde Newberry Building (1929), Salem Theater (former, 1930), and James J. True Building (1927). Located in the district are the separately listed Old Roanoke County Courthouse, Salem Presbyterian Church, and Salem Post Office.

The church was added to the National Register of Historic Places in 1996.

References

Historic districts on the National Register of Historic Places in Virginia
Greek Revival architecture in Virginia
Italianate architecture in Virginia
Queen Anne architecture in Virginia
Buildings and structures in Salem, Virginia
National Register of Historic Places in Salem, Virginia